The Gambia competed at the 2017 World Championships in Athletics in London, United Kingdom, from 4–13 August 2017.

Results
(q – qualified, NM – no mark, SB – season best)

Men
Track and road events

Women
Track and road events

References

Nations at the 2017 World Championships in Athletics
World Championships in Athletics
Gambia at the World Championships in Athletics